Ethyl benzoate, C9H10O2, is the ester formed by the condensation of benzoic acid and ethanol.  It is a colorless liquid that is almost insoluble in water, but miscible with most organic solvents.

As with many volatile esters, ethyl benzoate has a pleasant odor described as sweet, wintergreen, fruity, medicinal, cherry and grape.   It is a component of some fragrances and artificial fruit flavors.

Preparation 
A simple and commonly used method for the preparation of ethyl benzoate in laboratory is the acidic esterification of benzoic acid with ethanol and sulfuric acid as catalyst:

References

External links
Material Safety Data Sheet

Ethyl esters
Benzoate esters
Perfume ingredients
Flavors
Sweet-smelling chemicals